Ou is the pinyin romanization of the Chinese surnames  and , which share a common origin with the compound surname Ouyang, from the ruling family of the State of Yue during the Spring and Autumn period. They are commonly romanized as Au or Ao in Cantonese.

Ou 歐 is listed 361st in the Song dynasty classic text Hundred Family Surnames. As of 2008, Ou 欧 is the 134th most common surname in China, shared by 1.13 million people.

Most recently, by using the 2010 China census data and statistical analysis data that included random sampling from Taiwan, Hong Kong and Macau, the Fuxi Culture Research Association ranked the surname / 291st most common in China, shared by around 199,000 people (0.015% of the Chinese population) with the largest concentration of holders in Guangdong province.

Distribution
Ou was the 27,293th most common surname in the United States during the 1990 census and the 11,845th most common surname during the 2000 census. Au ranked 11,417th and 5,195th, and Ao ranked 88,459th and 58,402nd.

During the 2010 census, Ou, Au and Ao ranked as the 7,891st, 4,919th and 41,501st most common surname respectively.

Origins
The Ou and Ouyang are considered to both descend from the ruling family of the state of Yue during the Spring and Autumn period.

Many Ou have their ancestral roots in the Longgang, Zhongshan, Shunde, Panyu, and Xinhui areas of Guangdong.

List of people with the surname

Au
區瑞強 Albert Au Shui Keung, Hong Kong DJ and folk singer
區文詩 Angela Au Man Sze, Hong Kong DJ and member of Cookies
區錦新 Au Kam San, Macanese legislator
區雪兒 Susie Au Suet Yee, Hong Kong music-video director
區德 Au Tak or Au Chak-mun (1840–1920), Hong Kong developer, namesake of Kai Tak Airport and Munsang College
區家駒 (千里駒) Au Ka Kui (1886–1936), Cantonese opera performer
區丁平 Tony Au Ting-Ping, Hong Kong film and art director
區永權 Au Wing-Kyun, Hong Kong i-CABLE anchorman
區鳳墀 Au Fung-Chi, early Protestant leader in Hong Kong, gave name to Sun Yat-sen
區諾軒 Au Nok-hin, Hong Kong politician
區燕青 Alice Au Yin-ching, Hong Kong actress
區志偉 Au Chi-wai, Hong Kong snooker and pool player
區慶祥 Thomas Au Hing-cheung, Justice of Appeal of the Court of Appeal of Hong Kong
區嘉宏 Au Ka-wang, Director of Immigration of Hong Kong
區凱琳 Au Hoi Lam, Hong Kong artist

Ow
區耀漢 Ow Yao Han, Malaysian badminton player

Ou
區楚良 Ou Chuliang, member of Chinese national soccer team
區適子 Ou Shizi (1234–1324), Song-era author of the Three Character Classic
區星 Ou Xing, Han-era bandit and rebel leader
區曼玲 Ou Manling, Taiwanese author
區文雄 Ou Wenxiong (1894-1944), Secretary-General of Guangxi

Ao
歐文龍 Ao Man Long, disgraced Macanese Secretary for Transport and Public Works

Au
歐倩怡 Cindy Au Sin Yee, Hong Kong TV actress
歐健兒 Au Kin-Yee, Hong Kong scriptwriter
歐丁玉 Michael Au Ding Yuk, Hong Kong music producer
歐錦棠 Stephen Au Kam Tong, Hong Kong TV actor
歐偉倫 Au Wai Lun, Hong Kong soccer player
歐詠芝 Annie Au Wing Chi, Hong Kong squash player
歐鎧淳 Stephanie Au Hoi-Shun, Hong Kong swimmer
歐鎮銘 Leo Au Chun Ming, Hong Kong squash player
歐菁仙 Sharon Au, Singaporean actress
歐曉瑜 Michelle Au, American anesthesiologist and politician

Aw
歐萱 / 歐燕苹 Jeanette Aw Ee-Ping, Singaporean actress
歐大旭 Tash Aw Ta-Shii, Malaysian expatriate, author of The Harmony Silk Factory

Ou
歐大任 Ou Daren (1516–1596), one of the Latter Five Poets of the Southern Garden
歐定興 Edward Ou, Taiwanese TV actor
歐鴻鍊 Francisco Ou, former Minister of Foreign Affairs for the Republic of China
歐冶子 Ou Yezi, Spring and Autumn period master of sword-making from the state of Yue
歐震 Ou Zhen (1899–1969), World War II-era KMT general
歐泓奕 Howey Ou, Chinese environmental activist

Au (not classified)
Allison Au, Canadian jazz saxophonist
Carl Au, British actor, dancer, and singer
Celia Au, Chinese American actress and filmmaker
Elisa Au, American martial arts instructor
Jessica Au, Australian writer
Whitlow Au (1940–2020), Hawaiian bioacoustics specialist

See also
 O, for some Korean and Japanese surnames occasionally romanized "Ou"

References

Chinese-language surnames
Multiple Chinese surnames
Yue (state)